Nebria desolata is a species of ground beetle from Nebriinae subfamily that can be found in such US states as Colorado and Utah.

References

desolata
Beetles described in 1971
Beetles of North America
Endemic fauna of the United States